First Lady or First Gentleman of Mauritius is a term used by the media for the spouse of the sitting president of Mauritius.

Role of the first lady/gentlemen 
The spouse does not have any official duties or salary, but tend to participate in humanitarian and charitable work.

First ladies/gentlemen of Mauritius

See also 
 President of Mauritius
 List of presidents of Mauritius
 Spouse of the prime minister of Mauritius

References

 
Mauritius politics-related lists
Mauritius